The Green River Tunnel is a  vehicular tunnel that carries Interstate 80 (Dwight D. Eisenhower Highway)/U.S. Route 30 through a rock ridge in Green River, Wyoming, United States.

See also

References

External links

Road tunnels in the United States
Green River, Wyoming
Buildings and structures in Sweetwater County, Wyoming
Interstate 80
U.S. Route 30
Tunnels completed in 1966
Transportation in Sweetwater County, Wyoming
Transportation in Wyoming